A Cold-Blooded Epitaph is the first EP by American melodic death metal band The Black Dahlia Murder released in May 2002 on Lovelost Records, it is released as an MCD. This is the band's last release with guitarist John Deering.

"The Blackest Incarnation" and "Closed Casket Requiem" were to be later released on their following, full-length album, Unhallowed.

The EP features the cover of "Paint It Black", originally performed by The Rolling Stones in 1966.

Track listing

Personnel
The Black Dahlia Murder
 Trevor Strnad – vocals
 John Deering – lead guitar
 Brian Eschbach – rhythm guitar
 Dave Lock – bass
 Cory Grady – drums

Additional
 Mike Hasty – production, mastering
 John Strucel – artwork

References

The Black Dahlia Murder (band) albums
2002 debut EPs